The Old Style Saloon No. 10 is located in Deadwood, South Dakota, United States. The Saloon is best known as the site where the American Old West legend Wild Bill Hickok was assassinated by Jack McCall while playing a game of poker on August 2, 1876. Saloon No. 10 was originally located on placer claim number 10 from which its name is derived.  Fire swept through the mining camp in 1879 destroying the original structure, and a bar was later built at its former location.

Murder of Wild Bill Hickok
On the afternoon of August 2nd, 1876 Wild Bill wandered into Saloon No. 10 for a game of poker. The only chair left at the game was one which would place Wild Bill's back to the door, something he was uneasy with doing. Jack McCall entered the Saloon shortly after, he and Wild Bill exchanged greetings McCall walked around the table stopping to check each players hand. Finally positioning himself behind Wild Bill he pulled out his pistol and shot Wild Bill in the back of the head exclaiming "Take that damn you". Wild Bill fell forward and let his hand fall to the table, black aces and eights and the nine of diamonds which would come to be known as the Deadman's Hand. The Saloon still stages a re-enactment of the shooting during the summer months.

Notable patrons
The Saloon was frequented by many American Old West characters including:  Wild Bill Hickok, Calamity Jane, Colorado Charlie Utter, Texas Jack, California Joe, Buffalo Bill Cody, Doc Holiday, Poker Alice, Wyatt Earp & Potato Creek Johnny.

Further reading
The New York Times Style Magazine "The Old Style Saloon No. 10 stages a re-enactment of the murder of Wild Bill Hickok". (Maura, Egan. Kiss, Kiss,Bang Bang, There's gold in them there Hills. The New York Times Style Magazine, Winter 2005, p. 54.)

References

External links

Buildings and structures in Deadwood, South Dakota
Drinking establishments in South Dakota
1870s establishments in the United States
Poker and society